Nyctemera baulus is a moth of the family Erebidae. It is found from India to Samoa. Records include Queensland, Indonesia and New Guinea.

The wingspan is 45–48 mm. It is a day-flying species.

Larvae have been recorded on Brassica, Emilia, Senecio scandens and Crassocephalum.

Subspecies
Nyctemera baulus baulus (Buru, Java)
Nyctemera baulus alba Pagenstecher, 1901 (Samoa)
Nyctemera baulus aluensis Butler, 1887 (Salomon Islands (Alu))
Nyctemera baulus fasciata Walker, 1856 (New Hebrides)
Nyctemera baulus integra Walker, 1866 (Philippines)
Nyctemera baulus nigrovena (Swinhoe, 1903) (Sulawesi)
Nyctemera baulus nisa (Swinhoe, 1903) (Sangir)
Nyctemera baulus mundipicta Walker, 1859 (Malacca, Sumatra, Java)
Nyctemera baulus moluccana Roepke, 1957 (Moluccas)
Nyctemera baulus samoensis Tams, 1935 (Samoa)
Nyctemera baulus tertiana Meyrick, 1886 (Australia)
Nyctemera baulus pullatus (D. S. Fletcher, 1957) (Rennell Island)
Nyctemera baulus pratti (Bethune-Baker, 1904) (New Guinea)

External links
Species info at papua-insects
The Moths of Borneo
Australian Insects

Nyctemerina
Moths described in 1832